Italian profanity (bestemmia, pl. bestemmie, when referred to religious topics; parolaccia, pl. parolacce, when not) are profanities that are blasphemous or inflammatory in the Italian language.

The Italian language is a language with a large set of inflammatory terms and phrases, almost all of which originate from the several dialects and languages of Italy, such as the Tuscan dialect, which had a very strong influence in modern standard Italian and is widely known to be based on Florentine language. Several of these words have cognates in other Romance languages, such as Portuguese, Spanish, Romanian and French.

Profanities differ from region to region, but a number of them are diffused enough to be more closely associated to the Italian language and featured in all the more popular Italian dictionaries.

List of profanities in the Italian language 

 accidenti : literally accidents, used in the same context of English "damn", either as an exclamation of something gone wrong, or to wish harm (accidents) on someone (ex. "accidenti a lui", which can be translated as "damn him").
 baldracca (pl. baldracche) : whore.
 bastardo (pl. bastardi): bastard.
 bocchino (pl. bocchini) : blowjob.
 cagare/cacare (cacare is usually more used in Southern Italy. See Regional varieties of the Italian language): To shit, to defecate, more rarely not giving a fuck (about someone, usually with a negative verb): "A scuola nessuno mi caga": at school nobody gives a fuck about me. Cognate with Spanish and Portuguese cagar, ultimately from Latin cacare.
 cagata/cacata: Bullshit, crap
 Vai a cagare/cacare: fuck you, fuck off
 cazzo (pl. cazzi) : literally dick, cock, prick. Used in countless expressions to express a variety of emotions like anger, frustration or surprise in a similar way in which "fuck" and "fucking" are used in English.
 cazzo: fuck/shit/hell
 che cazzo: what the hell/fuck
 che cazzo fai: what the fuck are you doing
 cazzata: bullshit
 cazzo in culo: cock up your ass;
 testa di cazzo: dick-head
 incazzarsi: to get pissed off; “incazzato nero”: really pissed off;
 cazzeggiare: to fuck around.
 coglione (pl. coglioni)  a vulgar version of testicle; referred to a person, it usually means idiot, berk, twit, fool. In addition, it can be used on several phrases such as "avere i coglioni" (literally, "to have testicles", that is to be very courageous), "avere i coglioni girati" (literally, "to have twisted testicles") which means to be angry/in a bad mood, or "essere coglione" ("to be a jerk or fool"). Note that when said to a close friend ("ma quanto sei coglione") the word is not really offensive. Sometimes coglione was also featured in worldwide news when used by ex Italian Prime Minister Silvio Berlusconi referring to those who would not vote for him during the 2006 Italian election campaign. It derives from Latin coleo (pl. coleones) and is thus cognate to the Spanish cojones and Portuguese colhões.
 cornuto (pl. cornuti) : cuckold, literally "horned" – referring to a male whose female partner is cheating on him (or vice versa). Occasionally it might be coupled with the corna when saying that. In Southern Italy it is considered a rough insult.
 culo (pl. culi) : rough name for "buttocks", comparable to the English word ass or arse. It can also mean luck, as in "era tutto culo" 'it was all luck'. The popular expression "avere una faccia da culo" ("to have an ass-like face") indicates a cheeky, brazen-faced person. In some regions of the South, "stare sul/in culo" is used as a variant of "stare sul cazzo", both indicating dislike for someone else. It derives from Latin culus. In Northern Italy may also translate as "faggot", see entries below.
 culattone (pl. culattoni): faggot.
 inculare: to sodomize or (figurative) to cheat. 
 ditalino (pl. ditalini):  (lit.: "small thimble") fingering, female masturbation.
 fava (pl. fave):  (lit.: fava bean); dick; common in Tuscany.
 fica or figa (pl. fiche or fighe)  : pussy. In past times it was also the name of an obscene gesture called gesto delle fiche. It also means sexy, hot and attractive if referring to a woman (or a man when saying 'figo'). Contrary to popular belief, figa is not necessarily an offensive term. If referring to a guy (figo), it means someone really cool, a stud, someone "who always knows how to get pussy". Figo may also mean someone really skilled in doing something. The term strafiga referred to a woman means "smoking hot". The derived term figata means something cool. A less common synonym, mainly used in the Rome and Naples area respectively, is fregna and fessa. (even if fessa, m. fesso, can mean simply pussy but also stupid girl)
 finocchio (pl. finocchi) : (lit.: "fennel") a male homosexual; faggot; poof. A suggestive and very popular hypothesis suggests it may derive from the age of the Holy Inquisition in the Papal State, when fennel seeds would be thrown on homosexuals executed by burning at the stake — in order to mitigate the stench of burned flesh. However, there is no proof that this is the case.
 fottere: to fuck, commonly used in the expression "vai a farti fottere", meaning "go and get fucked" or "go fuck yourself"; ciulare and chiavare are synonyms, used in the North and in the South respectively.
 frocio (pl. froci) : roughly equivalent to the American "faggot", this term originated in Rome, but is now widely used nationwide. Less-used synonyms include ricchione (mainly Southern Italy, especially in Campania), culattone or culo (mainly in Northern Italy), busone (common in Emilia-Romagna and also a rough synonym for "lucky"), buco or bucaiolo (common in Tuscany) and finocchio (see). The usage of this word in Italian may by some people be considered homophobic and politically incorrect.
 gnocca (pl. gnocche) : typical Bolognese version of figa; is mostly conjugated in its feminine form although sometimes can be used in the masculine form. Although very vulgar, it is not offensive, but instead complimentary. Indeed, it is used nationwide to refer to an attractive woman.
 maiala: (lit.: "sow") whore, bitch; common in Tuscany and Umbria.
 mannaggia : a generic expression of frustration, mostly used in Southern Italy, it is not considered particularly vulgar or insulting, it is most often used jokingly; often translated as "damn" in English. Actually, it comes from the contraction of a former utterance, which means in Neapolitan language "may he/she get mischief out of it". Used also in English books, such as Mario Puzo's The Fortunate Pilgrim.
 merda (pl. merde) : roughly the same as English word "shit". Cognate to Spanish mierda and French merde.
 smerdare: to shame, to take down a peg or two.
 mignotta (pl. mignotte) : same meaning of puttana; according to some sources it may be the contraction of the Latin matris ignotae ("of unknown mother"), where the note filius m. ignotae ("son of unknown mother") appeared on the registries referred to abandoned children; other sources derive it from the French mignoter ("to caress") or mignon/mignonne.
 minchia (pl. minchie) : the same meaning as cazzo, but notably a feminine name, it originates from Sicilian language; nowadays it is common anywhere in Italy, where it is also used as exclamation of surprise, or even appreciation. It derives from Latin mentula.
 Testa di minchia: Dickhead.
 Minchione: Muggins, simpleton, fool.
 Minchiata: Bullshit, crap.
 Minchia!: Damn!, shit! hell!
 Bimbominkia: Stupid kid, especially referring to internet users.
 mona  (pl. mone): dialectic form of "cunt" or "pussy", commonly used in North Eastern Italy, more specifically in Veneto and Friuli-Venezia Giulia.
 moulinyan: Italian-American for "nigger"
 alla pecorina / a pecorina: (lit.: "sheep style") doggy-style.
 puttana (pl. puttane) : whore, prostitute.
 andare a puttane: go to whores, be fucked.
 puttanata: crap, bullshit, rubbish.
 puttanaio: brothel or fuckload.
 puttaniere: whoremonger, pimp.
 sputtanare: to discredit.
 porca Madonna: literally "pig Virgin Mary", a wide range of rude exclamations.
 porco Dio: God Damn! literally "pig God", a wide range of rude exclamations.
 pompino (pl. pompini): (lit.: 'small pump') blowjob.
 pompinaro (f. pompinara, pl. pompinari/pompinare): cock-sucker, person prone to perform oral sexual activities. More often used towards women.
 ricchione (pl. ricchioni) : faggot.
 sborra (or sborro, sburro, ; related verb: sborrare): cum.
 scopare : to fuck (lit.: to sweep).
 scoreggia (pl. scoregge) : fart.
 sega (pl. seghe) : wank, handjob. Literally the term could be translated as "saw". The derivative verb is not segare (which only means "to saw"), but fare/[farsi] una sega (get a handjob /[from yourself; to jerk off]).
 segaiolo: wanker.
 : mook, loser.
 mezza sega (literally half saw): lightweight, pipsqueak.
 spagnola (pl. spagnole): (lit.: 'Spanish [girl]') titty-fuck, titjob.
 sfiga (pl. sfighe), literally "without pussy", has the meaning of "bad luck". A typical exclamation when something goes wrong in Italy is "che sfiga!" ("What a bad luck!")
 sfigato (pl. sfigati) literally means "without figa", in English "without pussy".  It can be translated as "loser", "uncool" person.
 stronzo (pl. stronzi) : literally "turd", but also "arsehole" or "asshole", "bitch", "idiot", "stupid", "sod". It is used as adjective to indicate that somebody is really a bad, cruel, man/woman. It is derived from ancient German strunz ("shit").
 troia (pl. troie) , (lit.: sow): bitch, slut, slovenly woman or whore.
 vaffanculo : "fuck you!", "fuck off!", "bugger off!". It's a contraction of "va' a fare in culo" (literally "go do (it) in the ass"). "Vattela a pijà 'n der culo" is the Romanesco form for vaffanculo, while in Northern Italy "vai a cagare" (lit. "go to shit") is also used, "vai a dar via il culo" (lit. "go sell your arse") or "fottiti" (go fuck yourself). In the Neapolitan language it is pronounced "va fangool"; and at times the "va" is omitted, as demonstrated in the film Grease (at the end of the "Sandra Dee" skit, performed by Stockard Channing).
 zoccola (pl. zoccole) : slut, whore; bitch; zoccola also means "sewer rat".

Profanity in literature 
Italian writers have often used profanity for the spice it adds to their pages. This is an example from a seventeenth century collection of tales, the Pentamerone, by the Neapolitan Giambattista Basile:
 Ah, zoccaro, frasca, merduso, piscialetto, sauteriello de zimmaro, pettola a culo, chiappo de 'mpiso, mulo canzirro! ente, ca pure le pulece hanno la tosse! va', che te venga cionchia, che mammata ne senta la mala nuova, che non ce vide lo primmo de maggio! Va', che te sia data lanzata catalana o che te sia dato stoccata co na funa, che non se perda lo sango, o che te vangano mille malanne, co l'avanzo e priesa e vento alla vela, che se ne perda la semmenta, guzzo, guitto, figlio de 'ngabellata, mariuolo!

This tirade could be translated from Neapolitan like this:
 Ah, good for nothing, feather, full of shit, bedpisser, jack of the harpsichord, shirt on the arse, loop of the hanged, hard-headed mule! Look, now also lice cough loudly! Go, that palsy get you, that your mom get the bad news, that you cannot see the first of May. Go, that a Catalan spear pass through you, that a rope be tied around your neck, so that your blood won't be lost, that one thousand illnesses, and someone more, befall you, coming in full wind; that your name be lost, brigand, penniless, son of a whore, thief.

Francis Ford Coppola had some characters in The Godfather use untranslated profanity. For instance, when Sonny Corleone found out that Paulie Gatto had sold out his father to the Barzinis, he called Gatto "that stronz'". Also when Connie Corleone learned Carlo Rizzi was cheating on her, Carlo snapped: "Hey, vaffancul', eh?". Connie yelled back: "I'll vaffancul' you!".

Blasphemous profanity 

Profanities in the original meaning of blasphemous profanity are part of the ancient tradition of the comic cults, which laughed and scoffed at the deity. In Europe during the Middle Ages, the most improper and sinful "oaths" were those invoking the body of the Lord and its various parts – as the expression of the dialect of Bergamo pota de Cristo ("Christ's cunt") – and these were precisely the oaths most frequently used.

Nowadays, the most common kind of blasphemous profanity involves the name of God (Dio), Christ (Cristo), Jesus (Gesù) or the Virgin Mary (Madonna) combined with an insult or sometimes an animal, the most used being porco ("pig") as in porco Dio ("God is a pig") or cane ("dog") as in Dio cane ("God (is a) dog") or porca Madonna ("the Virgin Mary (is a) pig").

Common blasphemous profanity in Italian are: porco Dio (often written porcodio or also porcoddio), Dio cane (lit. "God (is a) dog"), Dio merda, Dio bestia, Dio maiale, porco Gesù, Gesù cane, Madonna puttana, porco il Cristo, Dio stronzo, Dio Fauss (or Dio Fa', more colloquially).

In some areas of Italy, such as Veneto, Friuli-Venezia Giulia, Umbria, Marche, Lazio, Abruzzo, Emilia Romagna, Piedmont, Lombardy and Tuscany, blasphemy is more common, but not because of a strong anti-Catholic feeling.. Tuscany and Veneto are the regions where bestemmiare is most common, and in these areas blasphemy appears in the everyday speech almost as an ordinary interjection. The historical reasons for this are the various conflicts that these two regions have had with the Vatican..

At the same time, it is not an entirely uncommon pastime to come up with creative and articulated bestemmie  especially among the lower social classes such as dockers.

Since the dawn of the World Wide Web several websites have come and gone that feature a user-submitted or machine-generated collection of complex bestemmie and manuals have been printed.

Gravity 
In the Italian language profanities belonging to this category are called bestemmie (singular: bestemmia), in which God, the Virgin Mary, Jesus, the Saints or the Roman Catholic Church are insulted. This category is so strong it is usually frowned upon even by people who would make casual or even regular use of the profanities above.

Bestemmiare ("swearing") is a misdemeanor in Italian law, but the law is seldom enforced. However, it is still considered a strong social taboo at least on television. For example, anyone caught uttering bestemmie in the Italian Big Brother (Grande Fratello) "must be immediately expelled" because they offend "millions of believers".

Legal status 
Until 1999, uttering blasphemies in public was considered a criminal misdemeanor in Italy (although enforcement was all but non-existent), while nowadays it has been downgraded to an administrative misdemeanor. Some local administrations still ban the practice. For example, after the curate complained about the frequency of blasphemous profanity in the parish recreation centre, the comune of Brignano Gera d'Adda banned the practice in the civic centre and in all places of retail business, be it public or private. Only obscenities that are directly related to God are classified as a bestemmia under Italian law as of July 2011. Any insult to Mary or the various saints do not actually represent a bestemmia or any violation of existing laws and rules.

Minced oaths 
These profanities are also commonly altered to minced oaths with very slight changes in order not to appear blasphemies. For instance:
 Porco zio, using zio instead of Dio, where zio is Italian for uncle; or orco Dio, where porco is replaced by orco ("ogre"), even though this second one results in a profanity as well. Other similar minced oaths can be created also replacing Dio with a series of existent or meaningless terms like disi, Diaz, due (two), disco, dinci, Dionigi (Dyonisius), Diomede (Diomedes), Diavolo (devil). A more recent alteration is zio pera, where porco is replaced by pera ("pear")
 Maremma maiala, using Maremma instead of Madonna (Maremma is a seaside zone of Tuscany and maiala means "sow"). The idiom is widely used in Tuscany, whose origin is attributed to the swamps of Maremma that used to cause malaria and other diseases among the Tuscan population. An expression somewhat similar is Maremma bucaiola (bucaiola means "sodomite").
 Porca madosca, using madosca instead of Madonna, where madosca means nothing and it sounds like a macaronic Russian version of Madonna.
 Dio boria, that is used instead of Dio boia. Boria means "arrogance", boia means "executioner".
 Porco disco (literally swine disk), that is used instead of Porco Dio.
 Porco discord, where Discord is a euphemism of Dio, even though Discord is a social media.

Other minced oaths can be created on the fly when people begin to utter one of the above blasphemies, but then choose to "correct" them in real time. The principal example is somebody beginning to say Dio cane (where cane means "dog") and choosing to say instead Dio cantante ("God (is a) singer") or Dio cantautore ("God (is a) songwriter"). Another minced oath is "Dio mama" (mum God), common in Veneto. A peculiar minced oath created on the fly, especially popular among Italian teenagers, has the form of a rhyme and read as follows: "Dio can...taci il Vangelo, Dio por...taci la pace!" and it means "God, sing to us the Gospel, God bring us peace!".

Cristo! or Cristo santo!, used to express rage and/or disappointment (similar to "Oh my God" or "Holy Christ"), is usually not considered a bestemmia, though it may be assumed to violate the second commandment of not making "wrongful use of the name of the Lord Thy God". Same for "Dio Cristo".

See also 

 Latin profanity

References

Bibliography and sources 
 Bakhtin, Mikhail. Rabelais and His World [1941]. Trans. Hélène Iswolsky. Bloomington: Indiana University Press, 1993.
 Tartamella, Vito. Parolacce. Perché le diciamo, che cosa significano, quali effetti hanno. BUR, 2006.
 Domaneschi, Filippo (2020), Insultare gli altri, Einaudi, Torino.

External links 

 Parolacce: studies, news, research, curiosities on Italian profanity by Vito Tartamella

Italian language
Profanity by language